Joseph Potts (25 February 1889–1980) was an English footballer who played in the Football League for Bradford Park Avenue, Chesterfield, Leeds United and Portsmouth.

References

1889 births
1980 deaths
English footballers
Association football defenders
English Football League players
Ashington A.F.C. players
Hull City A.F.C. players
Portsmouth F.C. players
Leeds United F.C. players
Chesterfield F.C. players
Bradford (Park Avenue) A.F.C. players